Anil K. Jain (January 21, 1946 – November 14, 1988) was an Indian-American electrical engineer and Professor of the Department of Electrical Engineering and Computer Science at the University of California, Davis, known for his contributions on "two-dimensional stochastic models for images provided a firm theoretical foundation for a number of algorithms of spectral analysis, adaptive image estimation and image data compression", including work on transform coding for image compression and block-based motion compensation for video compression in particular.

Biography 
Born in India, Jain received a bachelor's degree in electrical engineering in 1967 at the Indian Institute of Technology in Kharagpur, and a master's degree in 1969 and Ph.D. in 1970 from the University of Rochester. He had conducted his doctoral research at the University of Southern California under guidance of Richard Bellman.

After graduation Jain continued as postdoctoral fellow and later assistant professor in the department of Electrical Engineering and in the Image Processing Institute of the University of Southern California. In 1974 he joined the faculty of the State University of New York at Buffalo, and in 1978 he returned to California and became a professor at the University of California, Davis.

In 1983 Jain received  the IEEE Donald G. Fink Prize Paper Award.

In 1988 Jain was recognized as a Fellow of the IEEE.

Work 
Jain's research interests ranged from "digital and image processing, computer vision, fast algorithms, real time digital systems architecture to stochastic processes and communication theory."

Image processing textbook 
Jain wrote an influential textbook, Fundamentals of Image Processing, published in 1988 by Prentice Hall.

Video compression 
Anil K. Jain was a contributor to the field of motion video compression. With his colleague Jaswant R. Jain, Anil published the original paper combining block-based motion compensation and transform coding in December 1981.

Subsequently, most of the video compression standards for two-way communications and video broadcast applications were based upon motion compensation and transform coding, including those most widely used today such as MPEG-1, MPEG-2 (used on DVDs) and the most common Internet video H.264/MPEG-4 AVC.

Optivision and its transform coding products 
While at University of California, Davis, Jain co-founded Optivision, Inc. in the mid-1980s with Professor Joseph Goodman from Stanford. Optivision pioneered both JPEG transform coding products for picture capture systems such as for the California Department of Motor Vehicles, and video compression systems such as videoconferencing that used the block-based motion-compensated transform coding techniques he developed.  Jain's work also inspired other video industry entrepreneurs such as Brian Hinman, co-founder of PictureTel, Polycom, and 2Wire.  Optivision later, after Jain's untimely death, had an initial public offering primarily thanks to the Optivision optical switching technology.

References

External links 
 Anil K Jain Obituary, November 1988

1946 births
1988 deaths
Video compression
Fellow Members of the IEEE
American Jains
American academics of Indian descent
University of Rochester alumni
University of Southern California faculty
University at Buffalo faculty
University of California, Davis faculty